Fred Ferdinando Mote or Fred Mote or just called Nando (born November 15, 1989 in Wamena) is an Indonesian footballer who plays as a midfielder for Perseru Serui in the Indonesia Super League.

Club career statistics

References

External links

1989 births
Association football midfielders
Living people
Indonesian footballers
Papuan sportspeople
Liga 1 (Indonesia) players
Persiwa Wamena players
People from Wamena